Sheila Lopez (born ) is an American electrical engineer and LGBT rights advocate. She cofounded and serves as president of the Native American PFLAG chapter in Phoenix, Arizona.

Life 
Lopez was born  in Winslow, Arizona to a Navajo mother from Greasewood, Arizona and a Mexican father from Winslow. Her maternal grandfather was a medicine man. Lopez was pregnant in high school before starting college. She completed an undergraduate degree in electrical engineering from Northern Arizona University. After graduation, Lopez joined HP Inc. as a manufacturing engineer. She worked in software testing, validation, and semiconductor fabrication. She joined Intel where she serves as the veterans and LGBTQ program manager.

Lopez joined PFLAG in 2009 after her two oldest children came out. In June 2011, she cofounded and serves as president of the Native PFLAG group supporting tribes in the Arizona area. In 2015, Lopez received a VH1 Trailblazer Honor for her LGBT rights activism. In 2019, she organized the first pow wow for the Phoenix Native LGBT and two-spirit community. She won the 2019 American Indian Science and Engineering Society Blazing Fame award.

References 

Living people
Year of birth missing (living people)
1970s births
People from Winslow, Arizona
American people of Navajo descent
American people of Mexican descent
21st-century American engineers
21st-century American women scientists
American women engineers
American electrical engineers
Women electrical engineers
American LGBT rights activists
Hispanic and Latino American scientists
Intel people
Hewlett-Packard people
Activists from Arizona
Northern Arizona University alumni
21st-century women engineers